BK Skottfint is a Swedish football club located in Gothenburg.

Background
BK Skottfint currently plays in Division 4 Göteborg B which is the sixth tier of Swedish football. They play their home matches at Bravida Arena in Gothenburg.

The club is affiliated to Göteborgs Fotbollförbund.

Season to season

Footnotes

External links
 BK Skottfint – Official website
 BK Skottfint on Facebook

Football clubs in Gothenburg
Football clubs in Västra Götaland County